Air Vice Marshal William Foster MacNeece Foster,  (21 August 1889 – 28 March 1978) was a senior Royal Air Force officer who was a member of the Combined Chiefs of Staff from 1942 to 1943. He later became a member of Oxford City Council and Lord Mayor of Oxford.

Early life
Born William Foster MacNeece on 21 August 1889 in Aldershot, Surrey, England, he was the eldest son of Colonel T. F. MacNeece RAMC. He was educated at Cheltenham College, a private school located in Cheltenham, Gloucestershire, England. He later assumed the surname of Foster by way of royal licence in 1927.

Military career
Having attended the Royal Military College, Sandhurst, Foster was commissioned on 6 February 1909 into the Queen's Own Royal West Kent Regiment as a second lieutenant. He was promoted to lieutenant on 2 February 1912. Having trained as a pilot, on 31 October 1913, he was awarded Royal Aero Club (RAeC) Aviator Certificate number 671. On 28 April 1914, he was transferred to the reserve of the Royal Flying Corps.

With the outbreak of the First World War, Foster would go on to serve in Europe. In 1914, he was a pilot in No. 3 Squadron RFC, conducting air reconnaissance over France. He was a captain when, on 9 September 1915, he was appointed a flight commander in the Royal Flying Corps. On 5 December 1916, as a temporary major, he was appointed wing commander and made a temporary lieutenant colonel. Foster was awarded the Distinguished Service Order (DSO) in the 1917 New Year Honours.

On 16 January 1919, he joined the Air Ministry as a Staff Officer, 1st Class. Foster became Air Officer Commanding No. 1 Air Defence Group RAF in 1929 and Air Officer Commanding No. 6 (Bomber) Group RAF in 1939. He served in the Second World War in this role before becoming a member of the Combined Chiefs of Staff in 1942, Head of Inter-Service Liaison Committee in Washington D. C. in 1943 and Head of the RAF Training Mission in China in 1944.

Later life
After the Second World War, Foster settled in Oxford. He served on the city council, and was Lord Mayor in 1966/7. He died on 28 March 1978.

Personal life
Foster married Jean Bruce in 1928. Together they had two daughters.

References

External links
RAF 'The Group Commanders'
Air Authority biography

 

1889 births
1978 deaths
Commanders of the Legion of Merit
Commanders of the Order of the British Empire
Companions of the Distinguished Service Order
Companions of the Order of the Bath
Members of Oxford City Council
Lord Mayors of Oxford
People educated at Cheltenham College
Recipients of the Distinguished Flying Cross (United Kingdom)
Royal Air Force air marshals of World War II
Military personnel from Aldershot
Graduates of the Royal Military College, Sandhurst
Queen's Own Royal West Kent Regiment officers
Royal Flying Corps officers